The 1949 Paris–Tours was the 43rd edition of the Paris–Tours cycle race and was held on 15 May 1949. The race started in Paris and finished in Tours. The race was won by Albert Ramon.

General classification

References

1949 in French sport
1949
1949 Challenge Desgrange-Colombo
May 1949 sports events in Europe